Resígaro is an Arawakan language spoken in the department of Loreto in Peru. Is is believed to be nearly extinct as of 2017 with only one remaining speaker.

Aikhenvald (1999) classifies it among the Western Nawiki Upper Amazonian languages. Kaufman (1994) had made it a separate branch of Upper Amazonian.

On November 25, 2016 the last female speaker of Resígaro, Rosa Andrade, was brutally murdered in a beheading at the age of 67. Her niece reported “She was beheaded. Her head was not found, neither her heart.”

The only other remaining speaker known was Andrade's brother, Pablo Andrade, who still lives. He and his late sister had been preparing a project with the Ministry of Culture to document their language since October 2016, and to update books on grammar and an outdated dictionary made in the 1950s by the Summer Institute of Linguistics, that promoted the translation of the Bible.

Language contact
Resígaro has many morphological borrowings from Bora, such as pronouns, number markings, and case markers. However, there are relatively few lexical loanwords.

Phonology

References

External links
 Resígaro DoReCo corpus compiled by Frank Seifart. Audio recordings of narrative texts, with transcriptions time-aligned at the phone level and translations.

Languages of Peru
Arawakan languages